is a vertically-scrolling shoot 'em up game developed and originally published by Psikyo in 1997 for the arcades as a follow-up to Strikers 1945. This game was also ported by Kuusou Kagaku to the PlayStation and Sega Saturn for Psikyo and re-released by Success in 2000. Agetec released Strikers 1945 II for the PlayStation in North America under the title Strikers 1945 in 2001, and Midas Games released it in Europe as a budget title in 2003. The game was also included in Psikyo Shooting Collection Vol. 1: Strikers 1945 I&II by Taito for PlayStation 2, later was released as a downloadable title for PlayStation Network by GungHo Online Entertainment, and finally for Android and iOS by Mobirix (as STRIKERS 1945-2). Also, after S&C Entertainment developed another version, they released it on Google Play, with the plane fire button removed, making it autofire and only tap the bomb and charge icons.

Gameplay

As in Strikers 1945, the player chooses one of six World War II-era fighter planes, then uses machine guns and bombs to fight through eight stages (the first four stages being in random order and the latter four stages in linear fashion). Once the game is beaten, a report showing how well the player did is displayed, and the game 'loops' with the difficulty much higher. Each game begins with three lives, and an extend is earned at 600,000 (or 800,000). When all lives are lost, the option to continue is given but the score is reset.

In the console versions, from the fifth stage onwards, in addition to the score being reset, the player must also replay the stage where they lost all their lives from the beginning.

Plot
Continuing where the last game ended, the forces of C.A.N.Y. have been demolished by the Strikers, but a faction known as the F.G.R. now has the C.A.N.Y. technology and plans to initiate global warfare with massive mecha technology. Once again, the Strikers are called into action to save the world.

Reception
In Japan, Game Machine listed Strikers 1945 II on their November 15, 1997 issue as being the sixth most-successful arcade game of the month.

Strikers 1945 II was mostly well received. Three reviewers from the Japanese Sega Saturn Magazine gave the version for this system the scores of 9-8-8/10, while French magazine Consoles + rated both the Saturn and PlayStation ports an 88%. Similarly, the original arcade version received a score of 88% from French magazine Player One.

On the other hand, Miguel Lopez from GameSpot gave the PlayStation release only a 5.8/10, recommending it just for the fans of the genre. IGN's David Smith voiced a similar opinion, but nevertheless gave it a "good" score of 7.3/10.

Chester Barber reviewed the PlayStation version of the game for Next Generation, rating it two stars out of five, and stated that "Strikers is a decent shooter of a type that's all but dead. Unfortunately, it hasn't aged well over the years, though if you're into old games, this would be worth a rental".

References

External links
'' at Nintendo Store
STRIKERS 1945-2 at Google Play
STRIKERS 1945-2 at App Store

Strikers 1945 II at MobyGames
Strikers 1945 II at World of Arcades
Strikers 1945 II at Sega Retro

1997 video games
Alternate history video games
Android (operating system) games
Arcade video games
IOS games
Multiplayer and single-player video games
PlayStation (console) games
PlayStation Network games
Psikyo games
Science fiction video games
Sega Saturn games
Vertically scrolling shooters
Video games developed in Japan
Video games featuring female protagonists
Video games set in 1945
Video games set in Japan
Video games set in Greenland
Video games set in Arizona
Video games set in France
Video games set in Namibia
Video games set in Brazil
World War II video games
Agetec games